The Cotui Limestone is a geological formation in Puerto Rico. It preserves fossils dating back to the Cretaceous period.

See also
 List of fossiliferous stratigraphic units in Puerto Rico

References

External links 
 

Geologic formations of Puerto Rico
Geologic formations of the Caribbean
Cretaceous Puerto Rico
Limestone formations of the United States
Limestone formations